Brigadier John Mordaunt, Viscount Mordaunt (c. 1681 – 5 April 1710) was an English soldier and politician.

The eldest son of Charles Mordaunt, 3rd Earl of Peterborough, he was educated at Christ Church, Oxford, after travelling in Holland in 1699.

He was elected, as a Whig Member of Parliament for Chippenham in 1701 despite a petition alleging, among other things, he was still a minor.  (That year he was aged about 20.) He was a political ally of his father's and managed the attempt to impeach Lord Somers in the House of Commons in the same year. At the General Election of 1705 he vacated his seat to unsuccessfully contest Nottinghamshire but returned to Chippenham later that year in a by-election caused by the death of a newly returned Whig member, and sat until 1708.

He saw distinguished service during the War of the Spanish Succession. As a captain, he led the forlorn hope of the 1st Foot Guards at the Battle of Schellenberg in 1704, and was one of the few to survive that bloody assault. Shortly thereafter, he helped lead another furious assault at the Battle of Blenheim and lost his left arm. On 25 August 1704, he was made colonel of the Scots Fuzileers in place of Brigadier Archibald Rowe, killed in the attack at Blenheim. On 26 June 1706 he exchanged regiments with Sampson de Lalo, then colonel of the 28th regiment, but resumed the colonelcy of the Scots Fuzileers in 1709 when de Lalo was killed at the Battle of Malplaquet.

In 1708, he married Lady Frances Powlett (d. 1715), daughter of Charles Paulet, 2nd Duke of Bolton. They had two sons:
Charles Mordaunt, 4th Earl of Peterborough (1708–1779)
Lt.-Col. John Mordaunt (c. 1709–1767)

He died of smallpox on 5 April 1710, and was buried at Turvey on 13 April.

References

Grenadier Guards officers
Deaths from smallpox
1680s births
1710 deaths
Infectious disease deaths in England
British military personnel of the War of the Spanish Succession
Members of the Parliament of Great Britain for English constituencies
Heirs apparent who never acceded
British courtesy viscounts
English MPs 1701
English MPs 1701–1702
English MPs 1702–1705
English MPs 1705–1707
British MPs 1707–1708